Gualberto Mauro Cía Montañero (3 July 1919 – 3 January 1990) was an Argentine boxer and actor. He was born in Buenos Aires. At the age of 29, when he was an assistant officer at the Argentine Federal Police, Cía qualified for the 1948 Summer Olympics held in London, United Kingdom in the light heavyweight classification. In a campaign marked by increasing injuries,  Cía managed to attain the bronze medal despite the coaching staff not wanting to clear him for the third-place match, as he had two swollen black eyes, cuts in the cheeks and eyebrows, and a right hand so swollen the boxing glove did not fit. Afterwards, Cía had no interest in becoming a professional boxer, retiring to take care of his sick mother while also becoming a sparring partner for Archie Moore. After a brief acting career in the boxing-themed films Su última pelea (1949), Diez segundos (1949) and Nace un campeón (1952), Cía unsuccessfully attempted to qualify for the 1956 Summer Olympics Cía is deceased.

1948 Olympic record
 Round of 32:  defeated Hennie Quentemeijer (Netherlands) on points
 Round of 16: defeated Felipe Posse (Uruguay) by disqualification in the third round
 Quarterfinal: defeated Franciszek Szymura (Poland) on points
 Semifinal: lost to George Hunter (South Africa) on points
 Bronze Medal Bout: defeated Adrian Holmes (Australia) referee stopped contest in the third round (was awarded bronze medal)

References

External links

Mauro Cía's profile at Sports Reference.com

1919 births
1990 deaths
Light-heavyweight boxers
Olympic boxers of Argentina
Olympic bronze medalists for Argentina
Boxers at the 1948 Summer Olympics
Olympic medalists in boxing
Argentine male boxers
Boxers from Buenos Aires
Male actors from Buenos Aires
Medalists at the 1948 Summer Olympics